Johnson ministry may refer to:

* First Johnson ministry, the British minority government led by Boris Johnson from July to December 2019
 Second Johnson ministry, the British majority government led by Boris Johnson from 2019 to 2022

See also
 Premiership of Boris Johnson
 Johnson cabinet (disambiguation)